Gillis II Coignet (September 1586 in Antwerp – after 1641 in Antwerp) was a Flemish history and landscape painter.

Gillis II was the son of Jacob Coignet (III) and Hester van Beringen. He married  Magdalena van der Beken on 29 September 1609. He had at least nine children: Jacob, Joanna, Anna, Egidius, Hester, Barbara, Michiel, Maria, Gulielmus. He joined the Guild of St. Luke in 1607 as a master's son. He was active until at least 1641/42.

Gillis' style resembles that of Gillis van Coninxloo and the Frankenthal school. Gillis' son Jacob was also a painter.

Works

Sources

References 

1586 births
1641 deaths
Flemish Baroque painters
Painters from Antwerp